, formerly Hayashi Noboru, was a neo-Confucian scholar and a bakufu official in the late Tokugawa shogunate.

Academician
Hayashi Daigaku-no-kami Gakusai was a member of the Hayashi clan of Confucian scholars, each of whom were ad hoc personal advisers to the shōguns prominent figures in the educational training system for the bakufu bureaucrats.  The progenitor of this lineage of scholars was Hayashi Razan, who lived to witness his philosophical and pragmatic reasoning become a foundation for the dominant ideology of the bakufu until the end of the 19th century.

This evolution developed in part from the official Hayashi schema equating samurai with the cultured governing class (although the samurai were largely illiterate at the beginning of the Tokugawa shogunate).  The Hayashi helped to legitimize the role of the militaristic bakufu at the beginning of its existence.  His philosophy is also important in that it encouraged the samurai class to cultivate themselves, a trend which would become increasingly widespread over the course of his lifetime and beyond.  One of Hayashi Daigaku-no-kami Razan's aphorism encapsulates this view:
"No true learning without arms and no true arms without learning."

The Hayashi played a prominent role is helping to maintain the theoretical underpinnings of the Tokugawa regime; and Hayashi Daigaku-no-kami Gakusai was the 12th hereditary rector of Yushima Seidō.

The privileges and honors he and his family and his clan had enjoyed up through 1867 were stripped from them during the turmoil which accompanied the Meiji Restoration in 1868.

Kanagawa convention of 1853

 Kaei 7 (1853): Commodore Perry returned to Edo Bay to force Japanese agreement to the Treaty of Kanagawa; and the chief Japanese negotiator was Daigaku-no kami Hayashi Akira, who was known to the Americans as "Prince Commissioner Hayashi".
"Immediately, on signing and exchanging copies of the treaty, Commodore Perry presented the first commissioner, Prince Hayashi, with an American flag stating that this gift was the highest expression of national courtesy and friendship he could offer.  The prince was deeply moved, and expressed his gratitude with evident feeling.  The commodore next presented the other commissioners with gifts he had especially reserved for them.  All business now having been concluded to the satisfaction of both delegations, the Japanese commissioners invited Perry and his officers to enjoy a feast and entertainment especially prepared for the celebration." – from American eyewitness account of the event

Hayashi Noboru's signature can be found on the Japanese translation of the Dutch text of the agreement negotiated between Commodore Perry and Daigaku-no-kami Hayashi, implying some degree of participation in this historic negotiation.

Notes

References

 Beasley, William G. (1955). Select Documents on Japanese Foreign Policy, 1853–1868. London: Oxford University Press. [reprinted by RoutledgeCurzon, London, 2001.   (cloth)]
 Blomberg, Catherina. (1994). The Heart of the Warrior: Origins and Religious Background of the Samurai in Feudal Japan. London: RoutledgeCurzon. 
 Cullen, L.M. (2003). A History of Japan, 1582-1941: Internal and External Worlds. Cambridge: Cambridge University Press.  (cloth)  (paper)
 Hawks, Francis. (1856). Narrative of the Expedition of an American Squadron to the China Seas and Japan Performed in the Years 1852, 1853 and 1854 under the Command of Commodore M.C. Perry, United States Navy, Washington: A. O. P. Nicholson by order of Congress, 1856; originally published in Senate Executive Documents, No. 34 of 33rd Congress, 2nd Session.  [reprinted by London:Trafalgar Square, 2005.  (paper)]
 Sewall, John S. (1905). The Logbook of the Captain's Clerk: Adventures in the China Seas, Bangor, Maine: Chas H. Glass & Co. [reprint by Chicago: R.R. Donnelly & Sons, 1995]

See also
 Hayashi clan (Confucian scholars)

Government of feudal Japan
Officials of the Tokugawa shogunate
1833 births
1906 deaths